Roberto Acuña (born September 14, 1990) is an Argentine professional basketball player, who plays with Ciclista Olímpico of Liga Nacional de Básquet (LNB).

Professional career
In his pro career, Acuña has played with San Isidro, in the Argentine 2nd Division; and with Ciclista Juninense, Peñarol and Quimsa, in the Argentine 1st Division.

National team career
Acuña has competed internationally as a member of the senior Argentina national basketball team: at the 2016 South American Championship, and at the 2016 Summer Olympics.

References

External links
FIBA Archive Profile
RealGM Profile
Latinbasket.com Profile

Living people
1990 births
Argentine men's basketball players
Basketball players at the 2016 Summer Olympics
Centers (basketball)
Ciclista Juninense basketball players
Olympic basketball players of Argentina
Peñarol de Mar del Plata basketball players
Quimsa basketball players
People from Rafaela
Sportspeople from Santa Fe Province